Benjamin Raye is an  American singer-songwriter and radio personality from Minneapolis, MN. He currently works at KQRS in Minneapolis as an on-air announcer, along with sister-station KXXR. He also writes and records music and performs many live shows in the Twin Cities area.

Career
His radio career began at KKIN in Aitkin, Minnesota. Since then he has also worked at stations such as Kiss 96.7 in St. Cloud, MN, KCLD in St. Cloud, MN  and BOB FM 106.1 in the Minneapolis area.

In 2012, Raye won the award for the most-promising new artist from the Independent Country Music Association in Nashville.

That same year, he also won an ICoMA award for the Most Indie-Friendly radio show, for his music show on BOB FM.

Raye also supports Minnesota local music, being a host of a music radio show on BOB FM radio for 10 years, followed by a rock show which has aired since 2015 on KXXR on Sunday nights.

The first song to make national charts for Raye was his single "Far Away" which made #582 nationally on the AAA (adult album alternative) charts on Mediabase on 8 October 2011.

In 2014, he released his first solo full-length CD, "Come And Get It".

Several of his songs have been played on radio stations across the U.S. His song "Shy Side Of Three" entered the top-400 on the Active Rock chart on 15 March 2014.

Also in 2014, Raye's song "New Guitar" charted nationally on the Mediabase Country Music charts for 3 weeks, peaking at #224.  His single "Downtown" peaked at #190 nationally on the Mediabase Country Music chart on 26 April 2014.

In early 2015, he had a second song enter the top-200 nationally on the Mediabase charts. "65 To Nashville" charted at #194 on 14 February 2015.

In 2016, Raye signed a contract with an indie record label out of Nashville, TN where he recorded his single "Somewhere" with long-time Tim McGraw drummer Billy "Thunder" Mason. The following year, he returned to Nashville to record his single "You Are My Love Song" with the label, again using Mason on drums.

Film
Aside from radio and music, Benjamin Raye has also made some cameo appearances on movies. In 2011, he appeared as himself in the movie "Invincible Force" His song "Like It Or Not" was also featured on a Halloween short-film titled "7 minutes" which was released on Halloween in 2013.

References

External links
 www.benjaminraye.com

Musicians from Minneapolis
Radio and television announcers
Songwriters from Minnesota
Year of birth missing (living people)
Living people